Citizen Force is a democratic socialist and progressive political party from Peru. Founded in October 2019, the party was institutionalized out of the union of the Decentralist Social Force and Citizens for Change.

History 
Formally announced following the dissolution of the Congress of the Republic of Peru, the party participated in the Together for Peru coalition for the 2020 parliamentary election. Upon the election's poor results as no seats were won, the party left the coalition, and filed for official registration at the National Jury of Elections.

The registration was ultimately unsuccessful, as the party was not going to reach the deadline in order to fully participate as an recognized organization at the 2021 general election. Days before the deadline, the party signed a political accord with the registered Purple Party in order to run together for the upcoming election. Among its members, LGBT activist Susel Paredes registered in the Purple Party and was selected to lead the congressional list for the constituency of Lima. Paredes was ultimately elected Congresswoman for Lima.

Electoral history

Presidential election

Elections to the Congress of the Republic

References

2019 establishments in Peru
Democratic socialist parties in South America
Political parties established in 2019
Political parties in Peru
Progressive parties
Socialist parties in Peru